Zsombor Újvári (born 1982) is a Serbian politician from the country's Hungarian community. He has served in the National Assembly of Serbia since 2022 as a member of the Alliance of Vojvodina Hungarians (Vajdasági Magyar Szövetség, VMSZ).

Early life and private career
Újvári attended primary school in Kanjiža and completed high school and higher electrical engineer training in Subotica. He graduated from the "Mihajlo Pupin" Technical Faculty in Zrenjanin in 2017 with certification as a graduate information technology engineer. He has worked in the public sector since 2012 and is employed by Komunalac in Kanjiža as a clerk for personnel records and information technology.

Politician
Újvári appeared in the sixth position on the VMSZ's electoral list for the Kanjiža municipal assembly in the 2020 Serbian local elections and was elected when the list won a landslide majority victory with twenty out of twenty-nine seats. After the election, he was appointed to the municipal council (i.e., the executive branch of the municipal government) with responsibility for tourism and information.

Parliamentarian 
Újvári received the fourth position on the VMSZ's list in the 2022 Serbian parliamentary election and was elected when the list won five mandates. He resigned from the Kanjiža municipal council following the election, on 22 July 2022, as he could not hold a dual mandate as a parliamentarian and a member of the local executive.

He is now a member of the parliamentary committee on labour, social issues, social inclusion, and poverty reduction; a member of the committee on the rights of the child; a deputy member of the committee on the judiciary, public administration, and local self-government; a deputy member of the agriculture, forestry, and water management committee; a deputy member of the European integration committee; a member of the European Union–Serbia stabilization and association committee; and a member of the parliamentary friendship groups with Italy, Romania, and Turkey.

References

1982 births
Living people
People from Kanjiža
Hungarians in Vojvodina
Alliance of Vojvodina Hungarians politicians
Members of the National Assembly (Serbia)